Begonia fuchsioides, the fuchsia begonia, is a species of flowering plant in the family Begoniaceae. It is native to Ecuador, Colombia, and western Venezuela, and has been introduced to Hawaii and Réunion. A small bush reaching , it is hardy to USDA zone 10a.

Hybrids
It is a parent of the following artificial hybrids:
Begonia × ascotiensis J.B.Weber – B. cucullata Willd. × B. fuchsioides Hook.
Begonia × digswelliana Dombrain – B. fuchsioides Hook. × B. obliqua L.
Begonia × ingramii T.Moore & Ayres – B. fuchsioides Hook. × B. minor Jacq.

References

fuchsioides
Flora of Ecuador
Flora of Colombia
Flora of Venezuela
Plants described in 1847